She-Hulk (Lyra) is an antihero appearing in American comic books published by Marvel Comics. Created by Jeff Parker and Mitch Breitweiser, the character first appeared in Hulk: Raging Thunder #1(August 2008). Lyra is from an alternate future of Marvel's main timeline, and is the daughter of that reality's Thundra and the Marvel Universe's Hulk.

Publication history
Created by writer Jeff Parker and artist Mitch Breitweiser, Lyra first appeared in a one-shot story entitled Hulk: Raging Thunder #1 (August 2008). She later appeared in Hulk Family: Green Genes #1 (February 2009). The character "received enough of a positive fan response to earn her a try-out in a brand-new mini-series." So in 2009 All New Savage She-Hulk, a four-issue limited series, began, written by Fred Van Lente with pencils by Robert Q. Atkins and Peter Vale.

She-Hulk appeared as a supporting character in Avengers Academy beginning with issue #20 (Dec 2011), making several appearances throughout the series.

Fictional character biography
Following the failed assassination attempt during which a key component of the male genetic birthing matrix—stolen to replace an identical component of the Femizon's matrix—is destroyed, Lyra is dispatched back in time to the era of Dark Reign on Earth-616 in a last-ditch attempt to prevent the extinction of her people. Assisted by Boudicca, a digital wrist toy reprogrammed with Femizon technology, Lyra begins seeking the greatest hero of the era—by which she inevitably means a man, due to the word's definition male-specific curse in her culture.  Due to many of the warring tribes of men having taken former heroes such as Wolverine and Sentry as symbols of worship to continue their war on the Femizons, Lyra hopes that by killing the greatest hero, the men will have nothing to worship and many Femizons will be spared.

She comes into conflict with the original She-Hulk (Jennifer Walters). In this fight, She-Hulk makes references to Thundra and how she looks similar to Lyra, which angers Lyra. It is then discovered that Lyra becomes weaker as she becomes angrier. Before Jennifer can capitalize, the Sentry intervenes. Lyra tells the Sentry that she is looking for the greatest hero, and the name of that hero is Norman Osborn. When Lyra finally manages to confront him, she reveals that her mission is not to kill him, but to breed with him.  Upon kissing him, she recollects all the evil he will be responsible for creating in the future and refuses to go through with it. Norman and the rest of the Dark Avengers corner Lyra, but Jennifer Walters rushes to her aid. Both manage to escape by the aid of A.R.M.O.R. Instead of returning to her Earth, Lyra decides to stay and become an agent of A.R.M.O.R.

Lyra went out in search of Jennifer Walters, as only she could help her in orientation on Earth-616. However, she is attacked by the Gamma Corps, who were hired by Osborn to capture her and Boudicca to recover incriminating files she stole from Osborn and to gain knowledge of the future that would be beneficial to Osborn. Lyra, however, proves to be too difficult to capture. She is later seen in the company of Red She-Hulk and M.O.D.O.K and has joined their ranks for unknown reasons. After Thundra betrays Intelligencia to aid Red Hulk, Lyra takes her position in the Frightful Four.

It is later revealed that Lyra only joined The Frightful Four in hopes of getting information on Jennifer's whereabouts.  She finds her in stasis on an Intelligencia base. Lyra manages to free her, but both are attacked by Red She-Hulk. After a brief fight with her, they manage to convince her to fight alongside them to stop Intelligencia. Following the defeat of Intelligencia, Lyra begins traveling with her father, brother, Jennifer, Rick Jones, and Betty Ross.

During the Fear Itself storyline, Lyra teams up with Namor, Loa, and Doctor Strange when Namor needs help reclaiming New Atlantis from Attuma, who was transformed into Nerkodd: Breaker of Oceans. The group is even assisted by Silver Surfer when he arrives to help.

Following the Fear Itself storyline, Lyra is seen as part of the new class of students when the Avengers Academy moves to the former headquarters of the West Coast Avengers.

After her time at the Avengers Academy, Lyra later resurfaces on an environmental crusade against fracking operations by large corporations. The Hulk, now controlled by his Doc Green persona, ambushes Lyra and attempts to defeat her as part of his plan to rid the world of Gamma-powered superhumans. He plans to send her back to her original timeline, but the process is hijacked by Doc Green's A.I., Gammon, who instead traps Lyra in a hellish alternate dimension. Randall Jessup and Daman Veteri (two of Doc Green's assistants) eventually manage to track down Lyra, only to find that she has become the empress of the dimension she was banished to, subjugating the male population and even forcing some of them into her own royal harem of sex slaves. However, she formed a peaceful matriarchy like her home world and she would rather stay there than go back. The three are accidentally teleported back to Earth-616, and Veteri and Jessup agree to become Lyra's servants until they can find a way to get her back to her kingdom.

Lyra is later shown to have indeed left the 616 and reunited with mother in Weirdworld, where the two have fun there.

Powers and abilities
In a calm state, Lyra possesses vast superhuman strength, which she is able to enhance further through a meditative fighting-trance (that also greatly enhances her sensory perception of her surroundings), as well as superhuman stamina, durability, agility, and speed.

Although comparable to Colossus for example, even when at her peak, Lyra possesses less raw power than the base/calm level of the original She-Hulk. Unlike her father, Hulk, Lyra actually becomes weaker rather than stronger when she gets angry. She still maintains super-human strength, with her lowest strength being equivalent to that of Spider-Man. This was done by her Femizon creators, as a fail-safe way to keep her from turning on them. Her father had  injected  her with power-inhibiting or modifying S.P.I.N. technology that negated the weakness, allowing her to transform into a nonpowered human state at will and turn into her Hulk form when angry like the rest of her family. However, this alternation was only temporary and her powers had returned to the way they were when she joined The Defenders.

Lyra developed a technique that enables her to fight in a trance-like meditative state when she is completely calm and at peace. Through her practice, Lyra can feel minute traces of gamma rays in every human being and use them to heighten her perception and reflexes, and in this state apparently possesses higher fighting skill than any of her other family members, being able to single-handedly summarily defeat the entire team of Norman Osborn's "Dark Avengers", with the exception of the Sentry.

Lyra can leap over 600 feet upwards, and 1000 feet across. She also possesses an immunity to the Venom symbiote—which she calls the "black bloom"—due to a vaccination injected when she was a child.

Thanks to her upbringing she is an expert fighter and killer with experience fighting super-powered humans as well as military types. She is also familiar with a wide variety of future tech and knows a lot of future history which, despite her best efforts, seems to be unfolding the way she was taught it did.

Reception

Accolades 

 In 2017, CBR.com ranked Lyra 14th in their "15 Fiercest Warrior Women In Comics" list.
 In 2019, CBR.com ranked Lyra 5th in their "Marvel: The 10 Most Dangerous Students To Attend Avengers Academy" list and 8th in their "Top Avengers Academy Students" list.
 In 2021, Screen Rant included Lyra in their "Marvel Comics: 15 Strongest Gamma Powered Characters (Who Aren't Bruce Banner)" list.
 In 2022, Screen Rant included Lyra in their "10 Best Marvel Characters Who Made Their Debut In The Hulk Comics" list in their "10 Best Female Superheroes & Villains Like She-Hulk" list.

Literary reception

Volumes

All-New Savage She-Hulk - 2009 
According to Diamond Comic Distributors, All-New Savage She-Hulk #1 was the 102nd best selling comic book in April 2009.

Doug Zawisza of CBR.com asserted, "All-New Savage She-Hulk #1 is rounded out with a seven-page behind the scenes conversation with Fred Van Lente, Jeff Parker, and Paul Tobin, moderated by editor Mark Paniccia. This may not be the most ideal way to try to justify the extra buck this issue runs above many other shelfmates, but it does offer a little more creativity than some randomly fished out reprint would." Joe Garza of SlashFilm included the All-New Savage She-Hulk comic book series in their "15 Best She-Hulk Comics You Need To Read," stating, "The story is also worth reading because it plants the seeds of She-Hulk and Lyra's friendship, which plays out further in She-Hulks: Hunt For The Intelligencia." Bryan Joel of IGN gave All-New Savage She-Hulk #1 a grade of 7 out of 10, writing, "The issue looks just as good as it reads, thanks to the duo of Peter Vale and Robert Atkins. The artists share the pencil duties, but the whole issue maintains a classic, traditional feel throughout, with some impressive figure work on Lyra herself. The artists do a good job matching the feel of Van Lente's script. It's always a gamble devoting an entire miniseries to an essentially unknown, unproven character, and Lyra may need a little tinkering to be a successful lead in the future, but All New Savage She-Hulk demonstrates a lot of potential and succeeds in being a fun old-school romp that is at least better than the last couple years of the title whose name it inherited."

In other media

Video games

 Lyra appears as an alternate costume/character for She-Hulk in Marvel vs. Capcom 3: Fate of Two Worlds/Ultimate Marvel vs. Capcom 3.

Collected editions

See also

 She-Hulk
 Skaar
 Hiro-Kala
 Scorpion (Carmilla Black)
 Red She-Hulk

References

External links
 
 Lyra at the Marvel Comics Database
 

Characters created by Jeff Parker
Comics characters introduced in 2008
Fictional genetically engineered characters
Fictional characters with superhuman durability or invulnerability
Marvel Comics characters who can move at superhuman speeds
Marvel Comics characters with superhuman strength
Marvel Comics female supervillains
Marvel Comics female superheroes
it:Lyra (personaggio)